Vollum is a surname. Notable people with the surname include:

Gerd Vollum (1920–2009), Norwegian politician
Howard Vollum (1913–1986), American engineer, scientist and philanthropist

See also
Vollum Institute, a research institute in Portland, Oregon, United States
Vollum strain, a strain of anthrax